Michele Giuseppe Canale (1808-1890) was an Italian historian.

Biography
He was born in Genoa, and through Cavour's influence secured the professorship of history and geography at Genoa's Polytechnic Institute. In 1858 he founded the Società Ligure di Storia Patria, a society to promote the study of national history.

Work
His most important publication was the Storia della repubblica di Genova (Vols. I.-V., 1858–74).

References
  This work in turn cites:
 de Gubernatis, Dictionnaire international des écrivains du jour (Florence, 1888)

1808 births
1890 deaths
19th-century Italian historians
Writers from Genoa